The sixth season of The Real Housewives of New York City, an American reality television series, is broadcast on Bravo. It aired March 11, 2014 until August 12, 2014, and is primarily filmed in New York City, New York. Its executive producers are Andrew Hoegl, Barrie Bernstein, Lisa Shannon, Pam Healy and Andy Cohen.

The Real Housewives of New York City focuses on the lives of Ramona Singer, Sonja Morgan, Aviva Drescher, Carole Radziwill, Heather Thomson and Kristen Taekman; returning cast member Luann de Lesseps was absent for 4 of the season's 23 episodes and was referred to instead as a "friend" of the housewives.

Production and crew
The Real Housewives of New York City was renewed for a sixth season in February 2013. The full cast, trailer and premiere date were released in January 2014 with a 30-minute special preview that aired on February 12, 2014.

The season premiere "If You Can Make It Here" was aired on March 11, 2014, while the twentieth episode "The Last Leg" served as the season finale, and was aired on July 22, 2014. It was followed by a three-part reunion that aired on July 29, August 5 and August 12, 2014, which marked the conclusion of the season. Andrew Hoegl, Barrie Bernstein, Lisa Shannon, Pam Healy and Andy Cohen are recognized as the series' executive producers; it is produced by Ricochet and is distributed by Shed Media.

It was reported the year gap between season five of The Real Housewives of New York and season six was attributed to a cast stand-off for a pay increase with Carole Radziwill posting on Twitter "Payscale is ridix + it irks me to be given ultimatums," as well as a ratings drop in season five. Season five debuted with a 1.66 total million viewers and dropped to less than a million during its season finale and season five being the second-lowest-rated season of the series, dropping 26 percent in the 18-49 demo from season four of The Real Housewives of New York.

Cast and synopsis

Cast
All six wives featured on the fifth season returned for the sixth installment however LuAnn de Lesseps returned in a recurring capacity which made Ramona Singer the last remaining original cast member during season six. De Lesseps stated stepping back in season six was her choice and that she is glad to be recurring during the season saying "It's a win-win for me, I'm still on the show. I'm still very much a part of the show, but it's not a fulltime thing. It's very engulfing when you're on it. It takes up all of your mental and physical energy." De Lesseps remained a part of the drama through the series and season six continued to document de Lesseps' relationship with Jacques that later ended. Although Aviva Drescher returned for the sixth season as a full-time cast member, in multiple episodes she was removed from the intro at the beginning of the episodes due to not attending the cast trips.

Season six introduced Kristen Taekman as a full-time cast member.
Taekman is an Elvis Presley obsessed entrepreneur, who launched a line of high-end greeting card boxes called "2nd Street Press" in 2009. Taekman is also a successful model and has been modelling since the age of sixteen,  appearing in Vogue Australia, Harper’s Bazaar, and Glamour. She has been married to Josh Taekman for ten years and the couple have two children together; Cash, 5, and Kingsley, 2.
Taekman revealed that her friend, and cast member of The Real Housewives of Beverly Hills, Brandi Glanville helped her get the role on The Real Housewives of New York City. Glanville introduced Taekman to Andy Cohen during an upfront party for NBC then Cohen asked Taekman "Why aren’t you on ‘Real Housewives’?"

Synopsis
Heather Thomson kicks off the season by hosting a party. Everyone is introduced to the new wife, Taekman,  but they're not excited about seeing Aviva Drescher after her past behavior. Despite Taekman and Thomson being friends prior to Taekman joining the series, the two find themselves at odds in Montana and the other ladies take sides.

Drescher's memoir gets her a book deal and she seeks Carole Radziwill for help due to her being an author. The meeting soon turns sour when the mention of a ghostwriter surfaces. Drescher hosts a housewarming for her home, but her and Radziwill get into an explosive argument, due to Radziwill hearing from Singer that Drescher had been gossiping about her. The argument between Drescher and Radziwill continues in the Hamptons at de Lesseps' house and this time Thomson steps in to defend Radziwill.
Away from the drama with the ladies, Drescher confronts her fears when she returns to the scene that took her leg when she was younger.
Drescher finds herself in a fight with de Lesseps after sending around a text that offended the Countess.

Taekman bonds with Thomson by taking part in a mud run, with their husbands involved. However, when her husband leaves her behind, Taekman is left feeling disappointed. Later, tension between the couple arises and deeper issues come out after he arrives late for dinner. The two seek professional help to get their marriage back on track.
Taekman and Radziwill catch up with their friends, and cast mates from The Real Housewives of Beverly Hills, Brandi Glanville and Yolanda Foster. 
Taekman is shocked to find out that her days of modeling may be over after meeting with an agent. She later pulls some matrimonial string and lands herself a modeling job.

Singer returns to the series after returning from a family trip to Africa. After avoiding Thomson's anniversary party, her and Taekman butt heads in the Hamptons for the Fourth of July weekend. The following day Singer stands up to Morgan and ends up spilling details of Morgan's debt all over the Hamptons.
The feud between Singer and Taekman worsens on a trip to Thomson's holiday home in the Berkshires after Singer throws a wine glass into Taekman's face. Singer's trip in the Berkshires doesn't last long after stumbling upon something that brings up the horrors of her childhood. The ladies question the real reason she left and plan to give her her just deserts once they return to New York. Singer and her husband plan for an empty nest as their daughter Avery heads off to college. During the reunion, host Andy Cohen asks Singer about the status of her marriage after reports of her and her husband getting a divorce after his being caught cheating. De Lesseps calls Singer out on her hypocrisy due to her previous comments in regards to de Lesseps' divorce.

Sonja Morgan performs a burlesque number in the Hamptons for a charity event and invites the other ladies along to watch. Sonja hosts a memorial for her recently deceased dog where the ladies attend to say their goodbye and support Morgan. During a trip in Saratoga, hosted by de Lesseps, Morgan drinks a little too much and things get out of hand.
Morgan finds herself arguing with de Lesseps in Montana after her facialist has been talking about de Lesseps.

Radziwill is honored at the Coney Island Mermaid Parade, and she invites Taekman, Morgan, de Lesseps and Thomson to join her on the float.

Reunion Seating Arrangement

de Lesseps is seated on the end of the left couch next to Radziwill during her appearance at the reunion.

Episodes

References

External links

 

2014 American television seasons
New York City (season 6)